Greenlee County Airport  is in Greenlee County,  southeast of Clifton and Morenci, Arizona.

The FAA's National Plan of Integrated Airport Systems for 2011–2015 categorized it as a general aviation facility.

Facilities
Its runway, 7/25, is 4,978 by 75 feet (1,517 x 23 m) asphalt.

In the year ending March 31, 2009 the airport had 1,110 aircraft operations, average 92 per month: 82% general aviation and 18% air taxi. Two single-engine aircraft are based at the airport.

References

External links 

 Airport Master Plan at Greenlee County website
 Airport page from Arizona DOT Airport Directory
 Aerial photo as of 25 June 1997 from USGS The National Map
 
 

Airports in Greenlee County, Arizona